Loida Maritza Pérez (born 1963) is a Dominican American author. She is most known for her 1999 novel Geographies of Home.

Biography 
Loida Maritza Pérez was born in the Dominican Republic in 1963. Rafael Trujillo’s reign over the island had ended two years prior and the nation's political status was uncertain, leading many families to emigrate. Loida Maritza Pérez's family left for the United States when she was three years old, where they settled in the Bronx in New York City. She grew up in the Bronx and the location features heavily in her writings.

Career 
Loida Maritza Pérez has written novels and short stories, most notably her novel Geographies of Home from 1999. She has also taught writing workshops and contributed to the publications Bomb, Latina, and Callaloo. Her writing has drawn comparisons to other Dominican American writers of her generation such as Angie Cruz, Nelly Rosario, and Junot Díaz, a group that is often seen as following in the footsteps of writer Julia Álvarez. Loida Maritza Pérez's works deal with the themes of intergenerational trauma, diaspora, displacement, and more. She has received awards for her work from the New York Foundation for the Arts, Pauline and Henry Louis Gates fellowship, El Diario, and Ucross Foundation.

References 

21st-century American novelists
Dominican Republic novelists
American writers of Dominican Republic descent
Dominican Republic women writers
Living people
1963 births
Hispanic and Latino American novelists
American women novelists
21st-century American women writers